Koraal Partir (also Koraal Partier) is a town in located at the northeast of Curaçao. It is situated close to the north coast of the island, and northeast of the capital Willemstad. The village of Brievengat lies to the west, and Sint Jorisbaai lies to the east. Koraal Partir was a former plantation which was abandoned around 1800. The town started to develop in the 19th century when former slaves settled in the area between the plantations of Santa Catharina, Koraal Tabak, Choloma and Sint Joris.

References

Bibliography

Populated places in Curaçao
Willemstad